Michael Thomas Atkinson (born 2 December 1994) is a footballer who plays as a right-back or midfielder for  club North Leigh and the Belize national team.

Early life
Atkinson was born in York, North Yorkshire and attended Archbishop Holgate's School.

Club career

York City
He played for York Schoolboys before joining York City's youth system. In March 2013, he joined Northern Premier League Division One North club Farsley on loan, making his debut on 30 March when starting a 2–1 away win over Ramsbottom United. He finished the loan with two appearances.

Atkinson signed a one-year professional contract with York in June 2013. His first and only involvement with the first team came as an unused substitute in a 0–0 home draw with Hartlepool United on 17 August. He joined Northern League Division Two club Northallerton Town in September 2013 on a one-month loan. He made only one appearance, starting in a 4–2 home defeat to Chester-le-Street Town on 28 September, and York manager Nigel Worthington wanted to loan him to a club in a higher division.

Non-League
Atkinson joined Northern Premier League Division One South club Scarborough Athletic on 8 November 2013 on a short-term loan, signing permanently on 19 December after being released by York. He signed for Northern Counties East League Division One club Selby Town in January 2014. 

Atkinson signed for National League South club Oxford City in July 2018 after a successful trial. He made his debut as an 84th-minute substitute in a 1–1 draw away to Weston-super-Mare on 25 August. He finished his time at the club with two appearances.

Atkinson signed for Southern League Division One Central club North Leigh in December 2019, making his debut on 26 December when starting in a 3–0 home win over Didcot Town. He finished the season, which ended prematurely due to the COVID-19 pandemic, with four appearances, and signed a new contract with the club in July 2020. He made three appearances in a second successive season to be ended prematurely due to the pandemic.

International career
Atkinson is eligible to represent Belize at international level through his mother and received his first call-up for the Belize national team when being named in their squad for the 2017 Copa Centroamericana. He made his debut as a 59th-minute substitute in a 3–0 defeat to Costa Rica on 15 January 2017. He made his first start two days later in Belize's 3–1 loss to El Salvador, in which he was substituted on 47 minutes. Atkinson finished the 2017 Copa Centroamericana with two appearances as Belize were eliminated after finishing bottom in the standings.

Style of play
Atkinson plays as a right-back or midfielder.

Personal life
Atkinson pursued a career as a physical training instructor in the Royal Air Force (RAF), starting the joining process in 2014, and has played for the RAF football team.

Career statistics

Club

International

References

External links

Profile at the North Leigh F.C. website
Profile at the Football Federation of Belize website

1994 births
Living people
Footballers from York
English footballers
People with acquired Belizean citizenship
Belizean footballers
Belize international footballers
Association football defenders
Association football midfielders
York City F.C. players
Farsley Celtic F.C. players
Northallerton Town F.C. players
Scarborough Athletic F.C. players
Selby Town F.C. players
Oxford City F.C. players
North Leigh F.C. players
Northern Premier League players
Northern Football League players
National League (English football) players
Southern Football League players
2017 Copa Centroamericana players
People educated at Archbishop Holgate's School
Royal Air Force Physical Training instructors
English people of Belizean descent